In mathematics, the Cartan–Hadamard conjecture is a fundamental problem in Riemannian geometry and Geometric measure theory which states that the classical isoperimetric inequality may be generalized to spaces of nonpositive sectional curvature, known as Cartan–Hadamard manifolds.

Informally, the conjecture states that negative curvature allows regions with a given perimeter to hold more 
volume. This phenomenon manifests itself in nature through corrugations on coral reefs, or ripples on a petunia flower, which form some of the simplest examples of non-positively curved spaces.

History 
The conjecture, in all dimensions, was first stated explicitly in 1976  by Thierry Aubin, and a few years later by Misha Gromov,  Yuri Burago and 
Viktor Zalgaller. In dimension 2 this fact had already been established in 1926 by André Weil and rediscovered in 1933 by Beckenbach and Rado. In dimensions 3 and 4 the conjecture was proved by Bruce Kleiner in 1992, and Chris Croke in 1984 respectively.

According to Marcel Berger, Weil, who was a student of Hadamard at the time, was prompted to work on this problem due to "a question asked during or after a Hadamard seminar at the Collège de France " by the probability theorist Paul Lévy.

Weil's proof relies on conformal maps and harmonic analysis, Croke's proof is based on an inequality of Santaló in integral geometry, while Kleiner adopts a variational approach which reduces the problem to an estimate for total curvature. Mohammad Ghomi and Joel Spruck have shown that Kleiner's approach will work in all dimensions where the total curvature inequality holds.

Generalized form 
in the model space of constant curvature k.

The generalized conjecture has been established only in dimension 2 by Gerrit Bol, and dimension 3 by Kleiner. The generalized conjecture also holds for regions of small volume in all dimensions, as proved by Frank Morgan and David Johnson.

Applications
Immediate applications of the conjecture include  extensions of the Sobolev inequality and Rayleigh–Faber–Krahn inequality to spaces of nonpositive curvature.

References 

Riemannian geometry
Measure theory
Conjectures